The Hungary–Romania border is the state border between Hungary and Romania. It was established in 1920 by an international commission (the "Lord Commission") presided over by geographers including Emmanuel de Martonne and Robert Ficheux, and historians Robert William Seton-Watson and Ernest Denis. The border was set by the Treaty of Trianon which was signed on 4 June 1920.

The border has been stable since the end of World War II, and is no longer officially in dispute between the countries.

The Hungary–Romania border is an internal border of the European Union.

History

Prior to World War I, the eastern and southern Carpathian Mountains formed a natural border between the Austro-Hungarian Empire and Romania.

Hungary and Romania became belligerents in World War I as Romania entered the war in 1916 on the side of the Allies. During that war the part of Transylvania south of the Maros (Mureș) and east of the Szamos (Someș) had been occupied by Romania forces at the time of the cease-fire agreement of Belgrade signed on 13 November 1918. On 1 December 1918, the Great National Assembly of Alba Iulia declared union with the Kingdom of Romania. Subsequently, the Romanian forces moved further into Hungary and occupied Budapest from August to mid-November 1919.

The Treaty of Trianon finalized the armistice between the Allies and Hungary. In the treaty Romania recovered all of Transylvania (including parts of Maramureș, Banat and Crișana),

Briefly during World War II, Northern Transylvania (including part of Maramureș and Crișana) was returned to Hungary under the Second Vienna Award in 1940. In 1944 as World War II drew to a close and Romania joined the war against Germany, the Allies agreed de facto to the Trianon boundaries, and this was confirmed at the Paris Peace Conference in 1946, and by the subsequent peace treaties formalized in 1947.

Geography

Border crossings

Road
 Cenad – Kiszombor (<7,5t)
 Nădlac - Nagylak
 Nădlac II - Csanádpalota (motorway)
 Turnu - Battonya
 Vărșand - Gyula
 Salonta - Méhkerék
 Borș - Ártánd
 Borș II - Nagykereki (motorway)
 Săcuieni – Létavértes
 Valea lui Mihai – Nyírábrány
 Urziceni – Vállaj
 Petea – Csengersima

Rail
All railway crossings are standard gauge. As of June 2019, all railway crossings have passenger traffic.
 Curtici – Lőkösháza, electrified 25 kV 50 Hz
 Salonta – Kötegyán
 Episcopia Bihor – Biharkeresztes
 Valea lui Mihai – Nyírábrány
 Carei – Tiborszállás

See also
Hungary–Romania relations
Union of Hungary and Romania

References

 
1920 establishments in Hungary
1920 establishments in Romania
1920 in international relations
European Union internal borders
Borders of Romania
Borders of Hungary
International borders